The National Pride March, also known as the Equality March for Unity and Pride and LGBT Resist March, occurred on June 11, 2017, in conjunction with Washington, D.C.'s annual pride parade, Capital Pride. The event was organized by New York gay activist David Bruinooge. By late January 2017, more than 50,000 people had expressed interest in attending the event on its Facebook page. The march also commemorated the 49 victims of the 2016 Orlando nightclub shooting.

Thousands gathered for the march in Washington, D.C., which went past the White House and on toward the U.S. Capitol.

Satellite demonstrations

Cities hosting pride events in conjunction with the national campaign include:
 Dallas
 Detroit
 Las Vegas
 Longview, Texas
 Philadelphia
 Ridgecrest, California
 San Jose, California
 Seattle

See also 
 LGBT culture in Washington, D.C.
 LGBT rights in the District of Columbia
 List of rallies and protest marches in Washington, D.C.

References

External links
 

2017 protests
2017 in Washington, D.C.
2017 in LGBT history
Events in Washington, D.C.
June 2017 events in the United States
LGBT events in Washington, D.C.
LGBT politics in the United States
Protests in the United States